The Richard Eaton Singers is a symphonic chorus in Edmonton, Alberta. There are 150 members in the choir, which frequently performs with the Edmonton Symphony Orchestra, and is at home in the Francis Winspear Centre for Music. The choir has commissioned and premiered new works by Canadian composers. RES has toured Canada and Europe.

History
The University Singers chorus was founded in 1951 by Richard Eaton, the first Chair of the Department of Music at the University of Alberta.  In 1969, after Eaton's death, the choir voted to rename the group after its founder.

Richard Eaton conducted the Chorus until 1967, and was succeeded by Alexandra Munn (1967–1973) and Larry Cook (1973–1981), both U of A faculty members.

The choir has completed a number of tours in Canada; in 1970 the choir performed several concerts in England, and in 1987 they traveled to The Hague.

In the 1980s the RES conducted evening concerts at Edmonton's All Saints Cathedral.

RES is currently conducted by Leonard Ratzlaff, a 30-year member of the RES in 2011.

References

External links
Official website

Musical groups established in 1951
Musical groups from Edmonton
Canadian choirs
1951 establishments in Alberta